Angelo Carlos Pretti (born 10 August 1965) is a former Brazilian football player.

Club statistics

References

External links

1965 births
Living people
Brazilian footballers
Brazilian expatriate footballers
J1 League players
Japan Football League (1992–1998) players
Yokohama Flügels players
Kyoto Sanga FC players
Montedio Yamagata players
FC Tokyo players
Expatriate footballers in Japan

Association football forwards